The Ogre may refer to:
 Baintha Brakk, a mountain in the Karakoram range of the Himalayas nicknamed The Ogre
 The Ogre (1989 film), 1989 Italian horror film directed by Lamberto Bava
 The Erl-King (novel), a 1970 novel also published as The Ogre
 The Ogre (1996 film), a 1996 film by Volker Schlöndorff based on the novel
 The Ogre (Idaho), a mountain in Idaho, United States
 The Ogre (オーガ, Ōga), referring to Yujiro Hanma from the anime and manga franchise Baki The Grappler

See also
Ogre (disambiguation)